Dyspessacossus hadjiensis is a moth in the family Cossidae. It was described by Franz Daniel in 1953. It is found in Iran.

References

Cossinae
Moths described in 1953
Moths of Asia